Les Philharmonistes is a Canadian documentary film, directed by Yves Leduc and released in 1971. The film centres on a group of workers at the Casavant Frères organ factory in Saint-Hyacinthe, Quebec, who are also active as an amateur orchestra.

The film won the Canadian Film Award for Best Theatrical Documentary at the 23rd Canadian Film Awards.

References

External links
 

1971 films
1971 documentary films
Canadian documentary films
Documentary films about classical music and musicians
Quebec films
National Film Board of Canada documentaries
Best Documentary Film Genie and Canadian Screen Award winners
1970s French-language films
French-language Canadian films
1970s Canadian films